Stevan Reljić (Cyrillic: Стеван Рељић, born 31 March 1986) is a Montenegrin retired footballer who last played for hometown club Rudar Pljevlja.

Club career
He played for Concordia Chiajna, FK ČSK Čelarevo, FK Tekstilac Odžaci, FK Rudar Pljevlja, Red Star Belgrade and FK Borac Čačak.

Career statistics

External links
 Profile on Red Star official site
 Profile and stats at Srbijafudbal
 Profile at Montenegrin Federation site
 Stevan Reljić Stats at Utakmica.rs

1986 births
Living people
Sportspeople from Pljevlja
Association football defenders
Serbia and Montenegro footballers
Montenegrin footballers
FK Rudar Pljevlja players
FK ČSK Čelarevo players
Red Star Belgrade footballers
FK Borac Čačak players
FK Vardar players
CS Concordia Chiajna players
First League of Serbia and Montenegro players
Montenegrin First League players
Serbian SuperLiga players
Macedonian First Football League players
Liga I players
Montenegrin expatriate footballers
Expatriate footballers in Serbia
Montenegrin expatriate sportspeople in Serbia
Expatriate footballers in North Macedonia
Montenegrin expatriate sportspeople in North Macedonia
Expatriate footballers in Romania
Montenegrin expatriate sportspeople in Romania